Contractility refers to the ability for self-contraction, especially of the muscles or similar active biological tissue 
Contractile ring in cytokinesis
Contractile vacuole
Muscle contraction
Myocardial contractility
See contractile cell for an overview of cell types in humans.

See also
motility

Cell movement